Meir Shahar (born in 1959 in Jerusalem) is the Shaul Eisenberg Chair for East Asian Affairs at Tel Aviv University.

Academic career
Meir Shahar attended the Hebrew University of Jerusalem and then studied Chinese in Taipei. He obtained a PhD in Asian languages and civilizations at Harvard University in 1992.His research interests include the interplay of Chinese religion and Chinese literature, Chinese martial-arts history, Chinese esoteric Buddhism, and the impact of Indian mythology of the Chinese pantheon of divinities.

Published works

Books
Chinese and Tibetan Esoteric Buddhism. Co-edited with Yael Bentor. Leiden: Brill, 2017.  
Oedipal God: The Chinese Nezha and his Indian Origins. Honolulu: University of Hawai'i Press, 2015.
India in the Chinese Imagination: Myth, Religion, and Thought. Co-edited with John Kieschnick. Philadelphia: The University of Pennsylvania Press, 2013.
 The Shaolin Monastery: History, Religion and the Chinese Martial Arts,  The University of Hawai'i Press, 2008.
 Monkey and the Magic Gourd (קוף ודלעת הקסמים) (in Hebrew). By Wu Cheng'en. Translated and Adapted by Meir Shahar. Drawings by Noga Zhang Shahar (נגה ג'אנג שחר). Tel Aviv: Am Oved, 2008. 
 Crazy Ji: Chinese Religion and Popular Literature, Harvard University Asia Center, 1998
The Chinese Religion (הדת הסינית) (in Hebrew). Tel Aviv: The Broadcast University Series Press, 1998. 
 Unruly Gods: Divinity and Society in China. Co-edited with Robert Weller. Honolulu: University of Hawai'i Press, 1996.

Essays

Reviews 
The Shaolin Monastery: History, Religion and the Chinese Martial Arts
 
 
Oedipal God: The Chinese Nezha and his Indian Origins
 
Crazy Ji: Chinese Religion and Popular Literature

References

External links 
 
 https://english.tau.ac.il/profile/mshahar

Living people
Harvard University alumni
Academic staff of Tel Aviv University
Year of birth missing (living people)